Gyromitra is a genus of about 18 species of ascomycete fungi.  They are a false morel - a frequently toxic mushroom that can be mistaken for edible mushrooms of the genus Morchella (morels).

Taxonomy
The name Gyromitra comes from gyro meaning convoluted and mitra meaning turban.

Analysis of the ribosomal DNA of many of the Pezizales showed the genus Gyromitra to be most closely related to the genus Discina, and also Pseudorhizina, Hydnotrya, and only distantly related to Helvella. Thus the four genera are now included in the family Discinaceae.

Species
The genus consists of the following species:

 Gyromitra ambigua
 Gyromitra anthracobia
 Gyromitra brunnea - known as a false morel
 Gyromitra bubakii
 Gyromitra californica
 Gyromitra caroliniana (North America)
 Gyromitra esculenta (Pers.) Fr. (1849) – a false morel
 Gyromitra fastigiata
 Gyromitra gigas – snow morel
 Gyromitra korfii – possibly a synonym of G. gigas
 Gyromitra montana – North American snow morel, possibly a synonym of G. gigas
 Gyromitra infula – elfin saddle
 Gyromitra leucoxantha
 Gyromitra perlata
 Gyromitra tasmanica

Toxicity
Some types of Gyromitra are highly poisonous when raw due to the presence of gyromitrin, although some species are edible when cooked and Gyromitra are sought after in Scandinavian countries. Widespread hemolysis has been reported from ingestion which can result in kidney failure. Methemoglobinemia has also been seen, although it is typically responsive to treatment with methylene blue. Seizures can also develop via inhibition of the neurotransmitter GABA.

References

Discinaceae
Pezizales genera
Potentially dangerous food